Thaumatopsis bolterellus is a moth in the family Crambidae. It was described by Charles H. Fernald in 1887. It is found in North America, where it has been recorded from New Mexico and Texas.

The larvae probably feed on grasses.

References

Crambini
Moths described in 1887
Moths of North America